Mahalaleel may refer to:

The name of an individual in the Generations of Adam, also called Mahalalel
The name of a descendant of Perez, in the Book of Nehemiah
A code name for Algernon Sidney Gilbert used in the Doctrine and Covenants - see List of code names in the Doctrine and Covenants